State Highway 19 (SH 19) is a State Highway in Kerala that starts from 
Munnar and ends Kumily. The highway is 106.0 km long.

The Route Map 
Munnar (starts from km 0/2 of Munnar Topstation Highway) - Devikulam town - Poopara - Kumbanpara road starts - Pooppara - Bodimettu road starts - Santhanpara Jn - Udumbumchola town - Vattappara junction - Amaravathy - Kumily (joins Kottayam Kumily Highway)

See also 
Roads in Kerala
List of State Highways in Kerala

References 

State Highways in Kerala
Roads in Idukki district